The Ministry of Commerce and Industry is one of the governmental bodies of Kuwait and part of the cabinet.

History 
The Ministry was established on 28 January 1963 under the name of the Ministry of Finance, Industry and Commerce.

Organisational structure
The ministry derives into following department:

Department of Consumer Protection
Assistance Agency for Tourism Affairs
Assistance Agency of the affairs of trade control
Assistance Agency of Affairs of World Organisations and Intellectual Property Rights
Assistance Agency for Corporate Affairs and Business Licenses
Assistance Agency for Foreign Trade Affairs
Technical Affairs and Trade Development
Assistance Agency for planning and technical support
Office of Foreign Capital Investment.

Former ministers

 Khalifa Khalid Ghoneim (Minister of Commerce and Industry)
Abdullah Al Jaber Al Sabah (Minister Commerce and Industry)
 Khalid Sulaiman Al Adsani (Minister of Commerce  and Industry)
 Abdul Wahab Yusuf Al Nafisi (Minister of Commerce and Industry)
 Jassim Khaled Dawood Al Marzouq (Minister of Commerce  and Industry)
 Jassem Mohammad Al Kharafi (Minister of Commerce and Industry)
 Faisal Abdul Razzaq Al Khalid (Minister of Commerce and Industry)
 Nasser Rawdhan (Minister of Commerce and Industry)
 Abdullah Al Jarallah (Minister of Commerce and Industry)
 Abdullah Rashed Al Hajri (Minister of Commerce and Industry)
 Hilal Mishari Mutairi (Minister of Commerce and Industry)
 Jassim Abdullah Al Mudaf, (Minister of Commerce and Industry)
 Hisham Al Otaibi (Minister of Commerce and Industry)
 Abdulwahab Al Wazzan (Minister of Commerce and Industry)
 Salah Abdul Redha Khurshid (Minister of Commerce and Industry)
 Abdullah Abdul Rahman Al Tawil (Minister of Commerce and Industry
 Falah Fahad Al Hajri. (Minister of Commerce and Industry)
 Ahmed Yacoub Baqer Al Abdullah (Minister of Commerce and Industry)
 Ahmad Rashed Al Haroun. (Minister of Commerce and Industry)
 Amani Bouresli (Minister of Commerce and Industry)
Anas Khalid Al Saleh (Minister of Commerce and Industry; February 2012 - January 2014) February 2012 to January 2014
 Abdulmohsen Al Madaj (Minister of Commerce and Industry)
 Yousef Al Ali Ph.D. (Minister of Commerce and Industry)

References

1963 establishments in Kuwait
Kuwait, Commerce and Industry
Commerce and Industry
Kuwait, Commerce and Industry
Economy of Kuwait